Peranambattu block  is a revenue block of Vellore district of the Indian state of Tamil Nadu. This revenue block consist of 51 panchayat villages.

References 

Revenue blocks of Vellore district